Paula Findlay (born May 26, 1989) is a Canadian triathlete.

Life and career
Findlay was born in Edmonton, Alberta. On September 9, 2009, Findlay competed at the Dextro Energy Triathlon - ITU World Championship Grand Final in Gold Coast, Australia.  She placed third in the under 23 women race.

In April 2010, Findlay won the 2010 Monterrey ITU Triathlon World Cup Elite Women's race.  She also had a victory at the June 26th Coteau-du-Lac ITU Triathlon Pan American Cup.  On July 24, Findlay won the ITU World Championship Series event held in London. She then won the ITU Triathlon World Championships Series event in Kitzbühel on August 14, making Findlay the only female triathlete to win consecutive ITU World Championship Series events in 2010.  Another victory for Findlay was achieved on August 20, 2010 at the Kelowna ITU Triathlon Premium Pan American Cup.

Paula Findlay won the first three ITU World Championship Series events of the 2011 season in Sydney, Madrid, and Kitzbühel. At that time, she was ranked 1st in the world by the International Triathlon Union. Due to a hip injury, Findlay had not competed since the IT World Championship Grand Final in Beijing, China on September 9, 2011.

Along with fellow Canadian triathlete Kathy Tremblay, Findlay qualified for the triathlon event at the 2012 Summer Olympics. Ultimately, due to her previous injury and to iron-deficiency anemia, she finished in 52nd place, the final athlete to complete the race.

She finished in ninth place in the women's event at the 2015 Pan American Games.

She has won the 2018 Ironman 70.3 North American Championships, the 2019 70.3 Ironman at Indian Wells, the 2019 Challenge Daytona (1 mile/37.5 miles/8.2 miles) and the 2020 Challenge Daytona (2 km/80 km/18 km), for which she won $100,000 USD, the most lucrative victory of her career. She got second at the 2022 Ironman 70.3 World Championships.

References

External links
 
 Paula Findlay personal blog

1989 births
Living people
Canadian female triathletes
Olympic triathletes of Canada
Sportspeople from Edmonton
Triathletes at the 2012 Summer Olympics
Triathletes at the 2015 Pan American Games
Pan American Games competitors for Canada
20th-century Canadian women
21st-century Canadian women